Robin Stein Bernstein (born 1953) is a Florida businesswoman who served as the United States Ambassador to the Dominican Republic from 2018 to 2021.

Education
Bernstein was born in Bridgeton, New Jersey and graduated from Bridgeton High School in 1972. She received a Bachelor of Arts in Language Area Studies from the American University School of International Service in 1975. She later earned a Master of Business Administration from the George Washington University School of Business in 1981.

Career
She started off as a Democrat and served as a transition team member for Jimmy Carter and then worked around the Democratic Party until 1986, when she became a Republican. She was a founding member of Trump's Mar-a-Lago Club, and has been his insurance agent for many years, leading to concerns about potential conflicts of interest, especially given the Trump Organization's pursuit of a licensing deal in the Dominican Republic.

References

1953 births
Living people
Ambassadors of the United States to the Dominican Republic
American University School of International Service alumni
American women business executives
George Washington University School of Business alumni
New Jersey Democrats
New Jersey Republicans
Bridgeton High School alumni
People from Bridgeton, New Jersey
American women ambassadors
American women diplomats